Jayant Parikh (born 2 April 1940) is an Indian artist, printmaker, and muralist. He is a student of N. S. Bendre, K. G. Subramanyan and Sankho Chaudhuri. He lives and works in Vadodara, India.

His work is held in the collections of the National Gallery of Modern Art (in New Delhi, Mumbai, and Bangaluru) and the Lalit Kala Akademi in New Delhi.

Biography 

Jayant Parikh was born on 2 April 1940 into a Gujarati Bania family in Bandhni village, Gujarat State, India. His family had a grocery shop in his village. He shifted to Vadodara in 1957 to study art at the Faculty of Fine Arts, Maharaja Sayajirao University, Vadodara.

In 1962, he acquired his Post Diploma in Painting under the teaching of N. S. Bendre. As an extra subject, he studied woodcut in graphics. Later on, he also learned etching and colorography.

He was a temporary lecturer in the faculty of fine arts M.S. University in 1970 for the painting department and in 1980 for the graphics department for one year short duration each time. He also had more than 74 one-man shows.

Works 
He participated in national and international art exhibitions including the Third Triennale–India.

His work has sold at auction houses such as Christie's, Sotheby's, and Dominic Winter Auctioneers.

His work is held in the collections of the National Gallery of Modern Art (in New Delhi, Mumbai and Bangaluru); Jehangir Nicholson Art Foundation, Chester and Davida Herwitz  collection famously known as  Herwitz collection, Chatrapati Shivaji Museum, Mumbai; and Lalit Kala Akademi, New Delhi.

Artist style and influence 
Parikh started his work initially as abstract: he practiced Cubism for one year. For this short duration of time, he was influenced by the art of Pablo Picasso. Later, after 1970, he had created his own style of painting, calling it Rhythm. Since his beginnings, his favorite subject remains Indian monuments and archaeological sites. He has always painted his art either on-site of his reference monument, or he paints a sketch and from that reference, he paints in his studio. Since 1970 he found the fourth dimension in his artwork which is motion, which he calls Rhythm. His art is influenced by nature, and he feels that he paints that rhythm in his painting.

Awards and honours 

 1959 Bronze medal at Bombay Art Society
 1960 Kalidas Exbhibition Award
 1960 All India Khadi Certificate of merits
 1960 Award by Jamu and Kashmir
 1961 The Governor of Maharashtra’s prize Bombay Art Society
 1961 Kalidas Exbhibition Award
 1961 Award by All India Redio
 1961 Gold medal at Indore
 1962 Gujarat Lalit Kala Award
 1962 Diploma of Merit at first international art exhibition in Saigon
 1962 Hydrabad Art Society Award
 1963 Gujarat Lalit Kala Award
 1963 Hydrabad Art Society Award
 1963 Kalidas Exbhibition Award
 1963 Government of India schorlorship from 1963 to 1965
 1964 Kalidas Exbhibition Award
 1965 Gujarat Lalit Kala Award
 1965 Gold medal at International book and art exhibition Leipzig Germany
 1965 Hydrabad Art Society Award
 1965 Kalidas Exbhibition Award
 1966 Kalidas Exbhibition Award
 1969 Two Awards by Railway
 1970 Gujarat Lalit Kala Award
 1970 National award for painting Lalit Kala Akademi, New Delhi
 1971 Gujarat Lalit Kala Award
 1974 Gujarat Lalit Kala Award
 1979 Gujarat Lalit Kala Award
 1980  National award for graphic Lalit Kala Akademi, New Delhi 
 2008 Gujarat Gaurav Puraskar by Gujarat State Lalit Kala Academi
 2017 Raja Ravi Varma Award by Megh Mandal Sansthan, Ministry of Culture, Govt. of India.
 2022 The Raja Ravi Varma Award for Excellence in the Field of Visual Arts by the Maharaja Ranjitsinh Gaekwad Charities.
Jayant’s name is listed 39th in 45 notable alumni of the Maharaja Sayajirao University of Baroda, like Dadasaheb Phalke, Vinoba Bhave, and Sam Pitroda.

See also
 Baroda Group
 List of printmakers
 List of Indian artists
 List of Indian painters
 List of Maharaja Sayajirao University of Baroda people

References

External links 
Jayant Parikh's website

Indian printmakers
Indian muralists
1940 births
Living people
Maharaja Sayajirao University of Baroda alumni
20th-century Indian painters
Indian male painters
Artists from Gujarat
Painters from Gujarat
20th-century Indian male artists